Amaya is a female given name and surname of Spanish origins, derived from the village of Amaya and its neighboring mountain in Castile and León, Spain. The name of the village, in turn, has Indo-European roots  and means "am (ma)" or "mother". The suffix io-ia is also used to form action names or toponyms, implying that the meaning of Amaya or Amaia is "mother city", as it will be called later, "the capital". Other hypothesis is that the name derived from the Proto-Basque or Basque word , meaning "the end". Variations include Amaia, Amayah, Ammaya, and Amya.

Amaya was one of the main villages of the Cantabri Celtic tribes, and played a key role in the Cantabrian wars during the Roman conquest of Hispania, and later, during the Visigothic Kingdom, as the capital of the Duchy of Cantabria. In the first stages of the Reconquista, the city was part of the repopulating efforts of the Kingdom of Asturias in the border region of Bardulia, the primitive territories of Castile.

The given name became popular in the Basque area after the 1877 novel . In the 1970s, the reasons for prohibition were that it could lead to confusion about gender. It went against good behavior and it was a Gipsy surname.

A Japanese surname  of unrelated origin also exists, "usually written with characters meaning 'heavenly valley'".

Notable people with the name Amaya, as derived from its Spanish origin, include:

Amaya

 Amaya Uranga (born 1947), Spanish singer, member of the Basque folk/pop sextet Mocedades
 Amaya Salazar (born 1951), Dominican artist
 Amaya Arzuaga (born 1970), Spanish fashion designer
 Amaya Garbayo (born 1970), Spanish swimmer
 Amaya Forch (born 1972), Chilean actress and pop singer 
 Amaya Valdemoro (born 1976), Spanish basketball player
 Amaya Gastaminza (born 1991), Spanish basketball player
 Amaya Alonso (born 1989), Spanish swimmer
 Maja Keuc (born 1992), Slovenian singer known as Amaya
 Amaya Coppens (born 1994) Nicaraguan student activist

Amaia 
 Amaia Andrés (born 1966), Spanish middle-distance runner
 Amaia Piedra (born 1972), Spanish athlete who specialized in long-distance running
 Amaia Montero (born 1976), Spanish Basque singer/songwriter, formerly part of the Spanish pop-band La Oreja de Van Gogh
 Amaia Olabarrieta (born 1982), Spanish football player
 Amaia Salamanca (born 1986), Spanish actress
 Amaia González de Garibay (born 1994), Spanish handball player
 Amaia Erbina (born 1997), Spanish rugby sevens player
 Amaia Peña (born 1998), Spanish footballer 
 Amaia Romero (born 1999), Spanish singer, representing Spain in Eurovision Song Contest 2018 as a duo Amaia y Alfred

See also 

 Amaya (surname)

References

Feminine given names
Spanish feminine given names
Amaia